Published in 1892, Chitrangada is a dance-drama, i.e. a Nritya-Nāṭya (Bengali: নৃত্যনাট্য) written by Rabindranath Tagore. The drama is based on the story of Chitrāngadā (IAST: Citrāṅgadā), the mythological princess of the Kingdom of Manipur and one of the wives of Arjuna according to the Mahabharata.

References

1892 plays
Bengali-language plays
Plays by Rabindranath Tagore